Lubber Run Fill is a fill on the Lackawanna Cut-Off railroad line in northwest New Jersey.  Located between mileposts 50.1 and 50.5 in Byram Township, it was built between 1908 and 1911 by contractor Waltz & Reece Construction Company.  It is 0.40 miles (0.64 km) long, has an average height of 64 feet (20 m), and a maximum height of 98 feet (30 m).  Most of its 720,000 cubic yards of fill material was excavated from the surrounding low-lying area. 

Lubber Run Fill is named for the Lubbers Run (the "s" was added to the stream's name sometime after the construction of the Cut-Off), which passes under the fill. A dam was built under the fill on the north side of the embankment, creating Dallis Pond, which flows into Lake Lackawanna.

Lubber Run Fill supports a tangent (straight) section of right-of-way that permits speeds of 70 mph (113 km/hr). It sits just east of Wharton Fill and just west of Bradbury Fill.

A single track is to be relaid across the fill as part of the reactivation of the Cut-Off, which was abandoned in 1983.  NJ Transit rail service is projected to begin no earlier than 2026.

References 

Lackawanna Cut-Off